This is a partial list of caves in Derbyshire, England, arranged alphabetically. Many lie within the Peak District National Park.

Some of the caves are protected Scheduled Monuments and are marked with * in the table below.

See also 

 List of caves in the United Kingdom
 Scheduled monuments in Derbyshire

References 

 
caves_in_Derbyshire